Thyrocopa brevipalpis is a moth of the family Xyloryctidae. It is endemic to the Hawaiian island of Kauai.

The length of the forewings is 9–16 mm. Adults are on wing year round. It has a remarkably variable wing pattern.

Larvae have been reared on Hedyotis terminalis.

External links

Thyrocopa
Endemic moths of Hawaii
Moths described in 1907